The 115th Regiment of Foot (Prince William's) was an infantry regiment of the British Army from 1794 to 1795. It was raised in May 1794, named for its colonel Prince William Frederick, Duke of Gloucester and Edinburgh, but was disbanded the following year.

References

External links

Infantry regiments of the British Army
Military units and formations established in 1794
Military units and formations disestablished in 1795
1794 establishments in Great Britain
1795 disestablishments in Great Britain